Shuanggui is an internal disciplinary process of the Communist Party of China.

Shuanggui may also refer to these places in China:
Shuanggui, Sichuan, in Jialing District, Nanchong, Sichuan
Shuanggui, Zhong County, in Zhong County, Chongqing
Shuanggui Subdistrict, Liangping District, Chongqing
Shuanggui Temple, Buddhist temple also in Liangping District